Nanchang (南昌) is the capital of Jiangxi Province, China

Nanchang may also refer to:

Locations
Nanchang County (南昌县), a county in Jiangxi, China, under the administration of Nanchang City
Nanchang District (南长区), a district in Wuxi, Jiangsu, China
Nanchang Subdistrict (南长街道), a subdistrict in Qiaoxi District, Shijiazhuang, Hebei, China
Bai Prefecture, a historical prefecture in modern Guangxi, China, known as Nanchang Commandery between 742 and 758

Military uses 

Nanchang Aircraft Manufacturing Corporation, now known as Hongdu Aviation Industry Group
Nanchang J-12, supersonic fighter built in the People's Republic of China for use by the PLAAF
Nanchang Q-5, Chinese-built jet ground-attack aircraft based on the Soviet MiG-19
Nanchang CJ-6, aircraft designed and built in China for use by the People's Liberation Army Air Force (PLAAF)
 CNS Nanchang (DDG-101), the lead ship of the Type 055 destroyer class of guided-missile destroyer in the People's Liberation Army Navy

Other uses
Nanchang dialect, dialect in Nanchang, Jiangxi, China

See also
Nam Cheong (disambiguation), Cantonese equivalent
Nanchong, Sichuan, China